Walewska may refer to:

 Walewska Oliveira (born 1979), Brazilian volleyball player
 Małgorzata Walewska (born 1965), Polish opera singer
 Marie Walewska (1786–1817), Polish noblewoman and a mistress of Napoleon
 Marie-Anne Walewska (1823–1912), French courtier and a mistress of Napoleon III
 Countess Walewska (1914 film), a Polish historical film
 Countess Walewska (1920 film), a German silent historical film